Steeles could refer to the following:

 Steeles, Toronto - a suburban neighbourhood in northeastern Toronto, Ontario
 Steeles Avenue - a major urban thoroughfare that forms a boundary between Toronto and York Region, Ontario

See also
 Steeles Tavern, Virginia - An unincorporated community in Virginia.